The 1910 Indiana Hoosiers football team was an American football team that represented Indiana University Bloomington during the 1910 college football season. In their sixth season under head coach James M. Sheldon, the Hoosiers compiled a 6–1 record, finished in third place in the Western Conference, shut out five of seven opponents, and outscored all opponents by a combined total of 111 to 6.

Schedule

References

Indiana
Indiana Hoosiers football seasons
Indiana Hoosiers football